Joé Seeten is a French sailor born on 31 May 1957 in Dunkirk.

Biography
He discovered sailing thanks to his father, who acquired his first boat in 1967. Joé has had a passion for sailing ever since. He trained as an electric technician. He setup his company, La Voilerie where for seventeen years he designed and produced sails. At the same time he participates in numerous crew races (Tour de France à la voile, Quarter Tonner World Championship, Discovery Route, Trans-Atlantic Twostar) which allows him to evaluate and prove his sails.

From 1989 to 1993 he sailing in Beneteau First Class 8 series finishing third in the French Championships and then in the European Championship where he finished third.

In 1995 started professionally solo race for four year in the highly competitive Figaro Class, before progressing onto the IMOCA 60 and in 2000 he competed in the pinnacle offshore solo event the round the world race the Vendée Globe onboard hid yacht "Nord-pas-de-Calais/chocolats du Monde".

In 2006 while competing in the Route du Rhum he activated his distress beacon after finding serious keel problems to his Class 40 yacht TMI Technologies. He also reported an injured shoulder that needed medical attention. The Bahamas-registered tanker Stavanger Eagle diverted and rescued him.

Rankings

References

1957 births
Living people
People from Dunkirk
French male sailors (sport)
Sportspeople from Dunkirk
IMOCA 60 class sailors
French Vendee Globe sailors
2000 Vendee Globe sailors
2004 Vendee Globe sailors
Vendée Globe finishers
Single-handed circumnavigating sailors